Peter Francombe (born 4 August 1963) is a Welsh former professional footballer who played as a defender.

Career
Following being an apprentice at Crystal Palace, Francombe joined hometown club Cardiff City in 1981, making three Football League appearances at the club. After departing Cardiff, Francombe played domestic football in Wales, playing for Bridgend Town.

References

1963 births
Living people
Welsh footballers
Footballers from Cardiff
Crystal Palace F.C. players
Cardiff City F.C. players
Bridgend Town A.F.C. players
English Football League players
Association football defenders